Aliabad-e Kafi (also Romanized as ‘Alīābād-e Kāfī; also known as ‘Alīābād) is a village in Khursand Rural District, in the Central District of Shahr-e Babak County, Kerman Province, Iran. At the 2006 census, its population was 55, in 13 families.

References 

Populated places in Shahr-e Babak County